Lucky Lew is a Norwegian rock group based in Bergen, Norway. Formed in 2006 by singer Villa:K(Katrine Stavnes) and guitarist Barillion. They released their first album Hello Miss Devine later the same year with bass player Svein Knutsen and drummer Whezz (Christen Sigridnes)

In September 2010, the band released their second album, Beauty In Aggression.

Beauty In Aggression

In February 2010, Lucky Lew went to RadioStar Studios in Weed, California to record their second album. Produced by Sylvia Massy and engineered/co-produced by Rich Veltrop, the album received the title Beauty In Aggression and was released on September 6, 2010 to generally favourable reviews in the press.

The first single from Beauty In Aggression album was the song Desert Angel, and it was released on May 25, 2010.

Members

Current members
Villa:K – Vocals (2006 – )
Barillion – Guitars (2006 – )
Svein Knutsen – Bass (2006 – )
Rune Hals – Drums (2014 – )

Former Members
Eskil Sæter – Drums (2008-2014)
Wolf (Christian Indregaard) – Drums (2007–2008)
Whezz (Christen Sigridnes) – Drums (2006–2007)

Discography

Albums

Singles

External links
Official website

"Har funnet identiteten med andreplaten" – Interview and article in Byavisen
"Heldiggrisene" – Article in Natt & Dag
Picture editorial in Natt & Dag from the Beauty In Aggression release concert
Lucky Lew interview for "Fuzz" on Bergen Student Radio – Part 1 (audio)
Lucky Lew interview for "Fuzz" on Bergen Student Radio – Part 2 (audio)

References 

Norwegian rock music groups
Musical quartets
Musical groups established in 2006
2006 establishments in Norway
Musical groups from Bergen